The 58th running of the Tour of Flanders cycling race in Belgium was held on Sunday 31 March 1974. Dutchman Cees Bal won the classic ahead of Frans Verbeeck and Eddy Merckx. The race started in Ghent and finished in Meerbeke (Ninove).

Course
A group of 40 was formed after the Oude Kwaremont, further reduced on the Muur van Geraardsbergen. At six kilometers from the finish Cees Bal broke clear from the group, powering on to the victory in Meerbeke.

Climbs
There were seven categorized climbs:

Results

Note: third-place finished Walter Godefroot tested positive for doping after the race and was disqualified, moving Merckx up to third.

References

Tour of Flanders
Tour of Flanders
1974 Super Prestige Pernod